Kaonde (kiiKaonde) is a Bantu language spoken primarily in Zambia but also in the Democratic Republic of the Congo. Kaonde and its dialects are spoken and understood by perhaps 350,000 people or more. It is estimated that approximately 2.3% of Zambians are native Kaonde speakers. Kaonde speakers overwhelmingly live in the Northwestern and parts of Central regions of Zambia.

Fewer numbers of Kaonde speakers live in the Democratic Republic of the Congo. However, they are not known or identified by the term Kaonde but rather by the term Luba.

In Zambia, Kaonde people occupying the following districts: Solwezi,Mufumbwe,Kasempa,Kalumbila and Mushindamo in the North-Western province, and Mumbwa in the Central province. Kaonde villages can also be found in the northern parts of Kaoma District in the Western Province.

Just like any other tribe in Zambia, Kaondes are ruled by the traditional leaders. The following are the chiefs of the Kaonde people recognised by the government of Zambia: Senior Chief Kapiji Kasongo Kamuyange Mujimanzovu, Senior Chief Kasempa, Chief Kapiji Mpanga, Chief Mumena, Chief Matebo, Chief Ingwe, Chief Mukumbi Kizela, Chief Mushima Mubambe, Chief Mulendema, Chief Mumba, Chief Kaindu, Chief Mukumbi Katotola and Senior Chief Mukumbi Ibaloli ( Originally, Mukumbi Ibaloli is a Lunda)

Strictly speaking, the term "Kaonde" refers to a group of people who are identified by a common language known as kiiKaonde. This group of people, like many others in Zambia, was originally part of the Luba Kingdom. They migrated south to area surrounding a stream called Kaonde in river Congo Basin. From there, the people migrated into what is now Northwestern Zambia. This group of people called their language kiiKaonde. Speakers of other Bantu languages use the prefix "chi" other than "kii" to refer to this language.

Grammar

Nouns 
Like other Bantu languages, Kaonde nouns are grouped into several semantic classes, ranging from those that denote human beings to those that denote things. The concord or agreement markers for each class is a prefix attached to verbs and adjectives related to the noun. Tense markers may modify the concord.

Pronouns 
Kaonde has personal, demonstrative and relative pronouns. The first and second person pronouns are independent of the noun class system. Third person pronouns are formed using the demonstrative pronouns for the ba noun class. Demonstrative are arranged by noun class and by deixis.

Sample text in Kaonde

Mu byambo byanji byalamata bantu bonse, Lesa waambile ne byambo bikwabo pa byo anemeka bumi ne mashi.

Transelation

In a declaration applying to all humans, God revealed more about his evaluation of life and blood

References

External links 
A sample paragraph in Kaonde

Lubuto Libraries, Kiikaonde Reading Lessons, Lubuto Library Special Collections, accessed May 3, 2014.
Kiikaonde language stories, Lubuto Library Special Collections
OLAC resources in and about the Kaonde language

Luban languages
Languages of the Democratic Republic of the Congo
Languages of Zambia
Library of Congress Africa Collection related